The 2003 Saskatchewan general election was held on November 5, 2003, to elect the 58 members of the Legislative Assembly of Saskatchewan (MLAs). The election was called on October 8 by Lieutenant Governor of Saskatchewan Lynda Haverstock, on the advice of Premier Lorne Calvert.

Campaign
Going into the election, the popularity of the New Democratic Party of Saskatchewan (NDP) had declined because of several controversies. Voters in this agrarian province were disgruntled because of a mediocre harvest, a disastrous summer for cattle producers – the American border had been closed to Canadian beef due to fears of mad cow disease; and the actions of a member of the NDP Cabinet who was found to have misled the people of the province on the nature of the Saskatchewan Potato Utility Development Company ("SPUDCO") – a publicly owned potato company that was inappropriately characterized as a public-private partnership that went bust in 2000.

Election issues included emigration (the province's population was falling because young people were leaving the province to look for work), honesty and integrity, privatization of public inter-city transit and energy supplies, and utility rates.

During the campaign, the NDP was attacked for an internal cartoon that had been leaked to the media. It depicted Saskatchewan Party leader Elwin Hermanson directing persons labeled 'NDP sympathizers' onto railway boxcars. The cartoon referred to speculation that, if elected, Hermanson would replace civil servants who were NDP supporters with Saskatchewan Party supporters. However, many associated it with the Holocaust – in particular Nazi Germany's deportation of Jews to concentration camps.

The campaign as a whole was seen as being quite negative, as the NDP constantly claimed that the Saskatchewan Party had a 'secret agenda' to privatize crown corporations to finance large tax cuts for business; the Saskatchewan Party had a difficult time refuting these claims, as several party members made comments that seemed consistent with this view.

Unlike many of the other provincial elections held in 2003, the election was widely regarded as too close to call up until a large proportion of the polls had reported. To the surprise of observers who believed the NDP would be affected by the poor pre-election conditions, the NDP won its fourth term in government. It actually picked up the one seat it needed for a bare majority. The election was ultimately decided in Regina Wascana Plains, which the NDP won by only 543 votes. Had the Saskatchewan Party won here, both parties would have had 29 seats each. All of the NDP's ministers were re-elected; except for two who had defected to the party from the Liberals.

The Saskatchewan Party cemented its grip on most of the rural seats, yet was unable to make further gains in urban areas.  It won two additional seats in Saskatoon, but was completely shut out in Regina (though as mentioned above it nearly won Regina Wascana Plains).  Believing he had taken the party as far as he could, Hermanson resigned as leader on November 18, 2003.

Although speculation was high that they could form the balance of power in the case of a minority government, the Liberals lost their one seat, shutting them out of the legislature for the first time since 1982. As of 2020, they have yet to return.

Results

Note: * Party did not nominate candidates in previous election.

Percentages

Ranking

6 closest ridings

Lloydminster: Milt Wakefield (SK Party) def. Wayne Byers (NDP) by 64 votes
Humboldt: Donna Harpauer (SK Party) def. Bryan Barnes (NDP) by 173 votes
Saskatoon Northwest: Ted Merriman (SK Party) def. Jim Melenchuk (Ind.-NDP) by 266 votes
Carrot River Valley: Allan Kerpan (SK Party) def. Mark Pitzel (NDP) by 360 votes
Weyburn-Big Muddy: Brenda Bakken (SK Party) def. Sherry Leach (NDP) by 385 votes
Meadow Lake: Maynard Sonntag (NDP) def. Ron Dosdall (SK Party) by 414 votes

Riding-by-riding results
People in bold represent cabinet ministers and the Speaker. Party leaders are italicized. The symbol " ** " represents MLAs who are not running again.

Northwest Saskatchewan

Northeast Saskatchewan

West Central Saskatchewan

Southwest Saskatchewan

Southeast Saskatchewan

Saskatoon

Regina

Opinion polls

CBC Saskatchewan (October 20 – 26, 2003):
NDP – 42%
Saskatchewan Party – 39%
Liberals – 18%
Other – 1%

Cutler Poll (October 29–November 5, 2003):
NDP – 47%
Saskatchewan Party – 37%
Liberals – 14%
Other – 2%

See also
List of political parties in Saskatchewan
List of Saskatchewan provincial electoral districts

References
 Elections Saskatchewan: Twenty-Fifth Provincial General Election
 Saskatchewan Archives Board - Election Results By Electoral Division

Notes

Further reading

External links
 CBC Digital Archives - Showdown on the Prairies: A History of Saskatchewan Elections

General resources
Government of Saskatchewan
Legislative Assembly of Saskatchewan
Legislature - Election 2003
Elections Saskatchewan
CBC - Saskatchewan Votes 2003

Parties

Parties with seats in the house prior to dissolution
Saskatchewan New Democratics (see also New Democratic Party)
Saskatchewan Party
Liberal Party of Saskatchewan (see also Liberal Party of Canada)

Other parties
Western Independence Party of Saskatchewan
New Green Alliance Party of Saskatchewan

Other Saskatchewan political links
Saskatchewan NDP Caucus
Lorne Calvert, NDP MLA for Saskatoon Riversdale
Judy Junor, NDP MLA for Saskatoon Eastview
David Forbes, NDP MLA for Saskatoon Centre

Saskatchewan general election
2003
General election
Saskatchewan general election